Frank Hampton McFadden (November 20, 1925 – December 28, 2020) was a United States district judge of the United States District Court for the Northern District of Alabama and later an attorney in private practice.

Education and career

Born on November 20, 1925, in Oxford, Mississippi, McFadden was in the United States Navy from 1944 to 1949 and from 1951 to 1953. He received a Bachelor of Arts degree from the University of Mississippi in 1950 and a Bachelor of Laws from Yale Law School in 1955. He was in private practice in New York City, New York, from 1955 to 1958, and then in Birmingham, Alabama until 1969.

Federal judicial service

On July 22, 1969, McFadden was nominated by President Richard Nixon to a seat on the United States District Court for the Northern District of Alabama vacated by Judge Harlan Hobart Grooms. McFadden was confirmed by the United States Senate on August 8, 1969, and received his commission on August 9, 1969. He served as Chief Judge from 1973 until his resignation on January 1, 1982.

Post judicial service

Following his resignation from the federal bench, McFadden became an executive with Blount, Inc., in Montgomery, Alabama, serving until 1995. In 1995, McFadden joined the Montgomery law firm of Capell and Howard, Inc., where he remains active as of July 2018, serving as Of Counsel at the firm. He specializes in drafting contracts for construction and procurement and alternative dispute resolution.

References

Sources
 
 Frank Hampton McFadden's obituary

1925 births
2020 deaths
Judges of the United States District Court for the Northern District of Alabama
United States district court judges appointed by Richard Nixon
20th-century American judges
University of Mississippi alumni
Yale Law School alumni
Lawyers from Montgomery, Alabama
People from Oxford, Mississippi
Military personnel from Mississippi
Alabama lawyers
Lawyers from New York City
Businesspeople from Alabama